The Korean Language Ability Test, or KLAT (formerly Korean Language Proficiency Test, or KLPT), is a proficiency test for non-native speakers of Korean language.

The standard KLAT test assesses the abilities of the test-taker for daily life and work, for professional and educational settings in Korea. There is also a Basic-KLAT, or B-KLAT, that "assesses whether or not examinees have basic communication ability."

As of February 2021, there are 36 testing venues in 11 countries. Most testing centers are located in South Korea, China, Southeast, and Central Asia.

See also 
 Test of Proficiency in Korean

References

External links 
 KLAT homepage 

Korean language tests
Education in South Korea